Petar Herceg-Tonić (later anglicized as Peter Tomich; June 3, 1893 – December 7, 1941) was a United States Navy sailor of Herzegovinian Croat descent who received the United States military's highest award, the Medal of Honor, for his actions in World War II.

Biography
Tomich was an ethnic Croat from Herzegovina born as Petar Herceg (family nickname 'Tomić') in Prolog near Ljubuški, Austro-Hungarian rule in Bosnia and Herzegovina. He immigrated to the United States in 1913, and joined the US Army in 1917.

World War I
Tomich served in the US Army during World War I, and enlisted in the US Navy in 1919, where he initially served on the destroyer .

World War II

By 1941, he had become a chief watertender on board the training and target ship . On December 7, 1941, while the ship lay in Pearl Harbor, moored off Ford Island, she was torpedoed during Japan's raid on Pearl Harbor. Tomich was on duty in a boiler room. As Utah began to capsize, he remained below, securing the boilers and making certain that other men escaped, and so lost his life. For his "distinguished conduct and extraordinary courage" at that time, he posthumously received the Medal of Honor. His Medal of Honor was on display at the Navy's Senior Enlisted Academy (Tomich Hall). Later, the decoration was presented to Tomich's family on the aircraft carrier  in the southern Adriatic city of Split in Croatia, on 18 May 2006, sixty-four years after US President Franklin D. Roosevelt awarded it to him.

Medal of Honor citation
For distinguished conduct in the line of his profession, and extraordinary courage and disregard of his own safety, during the attack on the Fleet in Pearl Harbor by the Japanese forces on 7 December 1941. Although realizing that the ship was capsizing, as a result of enemy bombing and torpedoing, Tomich remained at his post in the engineering plant of the U.S.S. Utah, until he saw that all boilers were secured and all fireroom personnel had left their stations, and by so doing lost his own life."

Legacy
 The destroyer escort , 1943–1974, was named in honor of Chief Watertender Tomich.
 The United States Navy Senior Enlisted Academy in Newport, RI is named Tomich Hall in honor of Chief Watertender Tomich.
 The Steam Propulsion Training Facility at Service School Command Great Lakes is named in honor of Chief Watertender Tomich.
 The U.S. Citizenship and Immigration Services Headquarters Conference Room in Washington, D.C., is named the Peter Tomich Conference Center.

See also

List of Medal of Honor recipients

References

Bibliography
 

1893 births
1941 deaths
People from Ljubuški
American people of Croatian descent
Austro-Hungarian emigrants to the United States
United States Army soldiers
United States Navy sailors
United States Army personnel of World War I
United States Army personnel killed in World War II
United States Navy Medal of Honor recipients
Foreign-born Medal of Honor recipients
Deaths by Japanese airstrikes during the attack on Pearl Harbor
World War II recipients of the Medal of Honor